The men's 15 kilometre freestyle pursuit cross-country skiing competition at the 1998 Winter Olympics in Nagano, Japan, was held on 14 February at Snow Harp.

The startlist for this race was based on the 10 km classical event from earlier in the games. The winner of the 10 km classical event, Bjørn Dæhlie of Norway, was the first starter in the pursuit. The rest of the competitors started behind Dæhlie with the same number of seconds that they were behind him at the 10 km classical event. The winner of the race was the first competitor to finish the pursuit.

Results
The time reflects the combined time from both the 10 km classical and the 15 km freestyle pursuit.

References

Men's cross-country skiing at the 1998 Winter Olympics
Men's pursuit cross-country skiing at the Winter Olympics